Bear Hills is a summit in Alberta, Canada.

Bear Hills's name is an accurate preservation of its native Cree name, mus-kwa-chi-si.

See also
Bearhills Lake

References

Hills of Alberta